Metaltella is a genus of South American intertidal spiders first described by Cândido Firmino de Mello-Leitão in 1931. One species, Metaltella simoni, has been introduced to North America.

Species
 it contains six species:
Metaltella arcoiris (Mello-Leitão, 1943) – Chile
Metaltella iheringi (Keyserling, 1891) – Brazil, Argentina
Metaltella imitans (Mello-Leitão, 1940) – Argentina
Metaltella rorulenta (Nicolet, 1849) – Peru, Chile, Argentina
Metaltella simoni (Keyserling, 1878) – Brazil, Uruguay, Argentina. Introduced to USA, Canada
Metaltella tigrina (Mello-Leitão, 1943) – Argentina

References

Araneomorphae genera
Desidae
Spiders of South America
Taxa named by Cândido Firmino de Mello-Leitão